Eve Muirhead  (born 22 April 1990) is a Scottish former curler from Perth and the skip of the British Olympic Curling team. Muirhead and the GB team became Olympic champions at the 2022 Winter Olympics in Beijing, having previously won the bronze medal at the 2014 Winter Olympics in Sochi.

As skip of the Scotland team, Muirhead won the 2011 European Championships in Moscow, the 2013 World Championships in Riga, the 2017 European Championships in St. Gallen and the 2021 European Championships in Lillehammer. She is also a four-time World Junior Champion (2007, 2008, 2009 and 2011). A four-time Olympian, she represented Great Britain at the Winter Olympics in Vancouver 2010, Sochi 2014, Pyeongchang 2018 and Beijing 2022 in which she was chosen as one of Great Britain's flag bearers at the Opening Ceremony. In Sochi, she became the youngest-ever skip, male or female, to win an Olympic medal. She curls out of the Dunkeld Curling Club based in Pitlochry.

She announced her retirement on 11 August 2022.

Career

World Junior Championships
Muirhead was born in Perth, Scotland and first appeared on the world curling scene at the 2007 World Junior Curling Championships in Eveleth, Minnesota as a third with skip Sarah Reid, and won the gold medal.

At the 2008 Scottish junior women's championship Muirhead skipped her own team, winning all games and thus qualifying for the next junior world championship. Muirhead was skip for the Scottish team at the 2008 World Junior Curling Championships in Östersund, beating Sweden (skipped by Cecilia Östlund) 12–3 in the final.

Muirhead returned to the 2009 World Junior Curling Championships in Vancouver to play at the Vancouver Olympic Centre, the future site of the 2010 Winter Olympics. She faced the hometown Canadian team led by Kaitlyn Lawes in the final and defeated them 8–6. Thus Muirhead repeated as the world junior champion skip and won her third world junior championship in a row.

In December 2009, Muirhead was awarded the BBC Scotland Young Sports Personality of the year for her achievements in curling.

In 2010, Muirhead was too preoccupied with the Olympics to play at the World Juniors, but she was back at the 2011 World Junior Curling Championships in her native Scotland. Muirhead won the gold medal at the World Juniors for an unprecedented fourth time in her career. She beat Canada's Trish Paulsen by a score of 10–3 in the final.

Winter Olympics

Muirhead was selected as skip for the Great Britain Women's curling team at the 2010 Winter Olympics in Vancouver, Canada. After winning only three of nine round robin matches with cliffhanger losses to the United States, Denmark and Canada, the team failed to qualify for the semi-finals. She also broke her broom on the ice, a major curling faux pas.

Muirhead continued as skip for the Great Britain Women's curling team at the 2014 Winter Olympics in Sochi, Russia. She won the Bronze Medal as the Great Britain team skip after beating Switzerland 6–5 in the Bronze Medal play-off, making her the youngest ever skip to win an Olympic medal.

Muirhead was skip for the British team at the 2018 Winter Olympics in PyeongChang, South Korea. She led her team to a 6–3 robin record, which qualified Great Britain for a semifinal match-up against Sweden's Anna Hasselborg rink. She lost to the Swedes in the semifinal, putting Team GB in the bronze medal game against Japan's Satsuki Fujisawa team. She lost this game as well, settling for fourth place.

Muirhead was once again selected as skip for the Women's curling team at the 2022 Winter Olympics in Beijing, China. On the last day of events she led her team to a 10–3 win over Japan, winning her first ever gold Olympic medal (Team GB's only gold medal of the Games).

World Championships
Muirhead won the silver medal as the Scottish team skip at the 2010 Ford World Women's Curling Championship after losing 8–6 to Germany in the final, which went to an extra end. The team finished the round robin matches in 3rd place with an 8–3 record, then advanced to the final by winning the 3 vs. 4-page playoff against Sweden and the semi-final against Canada, both games in 8 ends and on the same day. Her teammates were third Kelly Wood, second Lorna Vevers, lead Anne Laird and alternate Sarah Reid. Muirhead's rink did not win the Scottish championship in 2011, but she was invited to play as Scotland's alternate at the 2011 Capital One World Women's Curling Championship, where the team finished 9th. The team did win the Scottish championship in 2012 and would finish 6th at the 2012 Ford World Women's Curling Championship. She won the Scottish championship for a fourth time in 2013. The team would go on to play at the 2013 World Women's Curling Championship, where they defeated Sweden's Margaretha Sigfridsson in the final. The win made Muirhead the youngest skip ever to win the World Women's Curling Championship.

Muirhead next made it to the Worlds in 2015 and finished in 4th place. At the 2016 World Women's Curling Championship, the team missed the playoffs and finished in 5th place, while at the 2017 World Women's Curling Championship, Muirhead would take home the bronze medal.

Muirhead would not play at the World Championships again until 2021, after missing 2018 due to losing a playoff against that year's Scottish champion Hannah Fleming, losing the 2019 Scottish final to Sophie Jackson, and because the 2020 World Women's Curling Championship was cancelled due to the COVID-19 pandemic. At the 2021 World Women's Curling Championship, which was played in a bio-secure "bubble" due to the ongoing pandemic, Muirhead led Scotland to a 6–7 record for an 8th place finish.

In 2022 she also partnered with fellow Scot and Olympic silver medallist Bobby Lammie to win the mixed doubles world championship.

Personal life
Muirhead grew up in Blair Atholl, Scotland, and plays golf off scratch handicap at Pitlochry Golf Course. She is an accomplished bagpiper, piping at four World Championships.

On 5 April 2010, Muirhead modelled at the eighth annual fashion show Dressed to Kilt. It was announced on 17 May 2010 that Muirhead would be the new ambassador for Piping Live! 2010, a festival dedicated to playing the bagpipes which would run from 9–15 August later in the year. On 14 June 2010, it was reported that Muirhead had turned down the chance to become a professional golfer after receiving two scholarships from American universities. There is a portrait of her with broom, clubs and pipes at the National Galleries Scotland. Eve opened The National Curling Academy in Stirling in 2017.

In 2015 she was diagnosed with coeliac disease and, in 2018, underwent hip surgery.

In 2018 she received the Honorary degree of Doctor of the University (D.Univ) from the University of Stirling.

Muirhead was appointed Member of the Order of the British Empire (MBE) in the 2020 Birthday Honours for services to curling and Officer of the Order of the British Empire (OBE) in the 2022 Birthday Honours, also for services to curling.

Muirhead's father, Gordon Muirhead, was also an international curler. He competed in the 1992 Winter Olympics, where curling was a demonstration sport, and was alternate for Scotland's 1999 gold medal winning World Championship team. He won world silver medals in 1992, 1993 and 1995. 

She has two brothers, Glen and Thomas Muirhead, who are also both accomplished curlers.

Teams

Jr=Junior, E=European, W=World, O=Olympics.

Grand Slam record
Muirhead and her rink won their first-ever Grand Slam event by winning the 2013 Players' Championship. It marked the first time a European team has ever won a Grand Slam event (men's or women's) and the second non-Canadian team. It was also the first time a non-Canadian team had ever won the Players'. Muirhead faced the Swedish Margaretha Sigfridsson in the final, in a re-match of the 2013 World Championships. The Players' final was also the first-ever Grand Slam final between two non-Canadian teams. Muirhead won a second straight Grand Slam at the 2013 Curlers Corner Autumn Gold Curling Classic, becoming the first non-Canadian skip to win two Grand Slam titles in their career. Muirhead won a third slam at the 2014 Colonial Square Ladies Classic and followed it up with a fourth slam at the inaugural Women's 2014 Canadian Open of Curling. She won her fifth Grand Slam and third in a row by winning the 2015 Players' Championship. She won a sixth Grand Slam title by winning the 2016 Players' Championship.

Former events

Notes

References

External links

1990 births
Living people
Scottish female curlers
British female curlers
Olympic curlers of Great Britain
Olympic gold medallists for Great Britain
Olympic bronze medallists for Great Britain
Olympic medalists in curling
Curlers at the 2010 Winter Olympics
Curlers at the 2014 Winter Olympics
Curlers at the 2018 Winter Olympics
Curlers at the 2022 Winter Olympics
Medalists at the 2014 Winter Olympics
Medalists at the 2022 Winter Olympics
World curling champions
European curling champions
Officers of the Order of the British Empire
Curlers from Stirling
Sportspeople from Perth, Scotland
People educated at Morrison's Academy
Continental Cup of Curling participants